Vladimir Ilyich Ryzhenkov (27 August 1948 – 14 August 2011) was a Soviet light heavyweight weightlifter. Between 1972 and 1974 he won one world and two European titles and set 12 official world records: six in the snatch, three in the clean and jerk and three in the total.

At the 1974 World Championships, while trying to set his 13th world record, Ryzhenkov badly injured his elbow and had to retire from active competitions. Between 1977 and 1991 he trained weightlifters at his club Dynamo Moscow, and after that remained active as a weightlifting functionary.

References

1948 births
2011 deaths
Soviet male weightlifters
European Weightlifting Championships medalists
World Weightlifting Championships medalists